Gary Berry is a former safety in the National Football League.

Biography
Berry was born Gary John Berry II on October 24, 1977 in Worthington, Ohio.

Career
Berry was drafted by the Green Bay Packers in the fourth round of the 2000 NFL Draft and played that season with the team. Berry only had 1 kick return for 22 yards with the Packers. He played at the collegiate level at the Ohio State University.

See also
List of Green Bay Packers players

References

1977 births
Living people
People from Worthington, Ohio
Green Bay Packers players
American football defensive backs
Ohio State Buckeyes football players
Players of American football from Ohio